The 2014 European Junior & U23 Weightlifting Championships were held in Limassol, Cyprus from 21 November to 29 November 2014.

Medal overview (juniors)

Men

Women

Medals table

Medal overview (U23)

Men

Women

Medals table

Overall medals table

References

European Junior & U23 Weightlifting Championships
International sports competitions hosted by Cyprus
2014 in Cypriot sport
2014 in weightlifting